Kayla Meagan Iovan (born August 13, 1991), known by her stage name Kayla Rivera (formerly K-LA Rivera and Kaye) is a Canadian:Filipina-Romanian singer and actress appearing both in theater and television in the Philippines, best recognized for being a grand finalist of Star Powers "Sharon's Search for the Next Female Pop Superstar" and playing the title role in Atlantis Theatrical's: Beautiful – The Carole King Musical. Rivera is furthermore a recording artist, songwriter, model, host, video jockey, and voice teacher. Rivera is currently the Headhunter of POPinoy, a television show airing on TV5. She also performs  on "Eat Bulaga", (a noontime variety show) and is under the management of All Access to Artists, Inc.

Early life
At age 13, The Young Canadians (TYC) School of Performing Arts chose Rivera to be among their members where she trained both vocally and dancing (jazz and ballet) year-round, in preparation for nightly performances at the Grandstand show, at the Calgary Stampede.

When Rivera was 16, she auditioned for Canadian Idol in Calgary, and making it through initial auditions, she flew to Toronto and made it to the Top 65. That same year she was a co-winner of the David Foster Star Search (September 2007) and performed at the Jack Singer Concert Hall with David Foster. Later that month, Rivera was sent to Halifax, NS, to perform at the kickoff for the David Foster Star Search held in March. She also worked with David Foster at various events around Canada, including an appearance on Canada AM to promote the 2010 Olympics held in Vancouver, British Columbia.

Career 
In 2010 Rivera, appearing as K-La Rivera, became a part of Star Power from ABS-CBN.

On July 27, 2011, Rivera emerged as one of the finalists of the MYX VJ SEARCH and was one of three winners announced at SM North Edsa – The Block. She then began her career as VJ from 2011 to 2012.

In September 2011, Rivera made her professional stage debut in the local adaptation of the acclaimed Broadway musical In the Heights under Atlantis Production. She played the role of "Nina Rosario" alongside seasoned performers, namely Nyoy Volante, Jackie Lou Blanco, and Ima Castro. Rivera received her first nomination as "Best Actress in a Musical" at the Aliw Awards.

Rivera was chosen to sing the theme song “I’m Feeling Sexy Tonight”,  of the movie “Adventures of Pureza” which was released on July 4, 2011. Months later on March 16, 2012, Rivera released her first self-titled Album (K-LA) under Star Music Records. Included in her 5-track album are Inseparable, Love Has Come My Way,  Say That You Love Me, Someone’s Always Saying Goodbye, and You’re All That I Need.

In November 2012, following her success in the musical play "In the Heights," Rivera was selected by Atlantis Productions to play Princess Jasmine in the Manila staging of Disney's Aladdin.

In October 2013, Rivera created a buzz in the theater community after learning and taking on the lead role of Carrie White in less than a week. When lead star Mikkie Bradshaw-Volante fell ill after the Friday opening night of Atlantis Productions' staging of "Carrie,". Rivera went on earning her second nomination as "Best Actress in Musical Theater” at the Broadway World Philippines.

In November 2013, Rivera portrayed the role of Wednesday Addams in The Addams Family, a Broadway Musical staged by Atlantis Productions.

In February 2014, Rivera moved from ABS-CBN to GMA, specifically being co-managed by Maristel Fernandez and GMA Artist Center (GMAAC). With this move came a new screen name, Kaye. Rivera then started performing on the noontime show Sunday All-Stars. Rivera also appeared semi-regularly on the TV series Carmella and other various GMA shows.

In Aug 2014, Rivera made her big-screen debut in the film "S6Parados" under a Cinemalaya production directed by GB Sampedro. S6parados was based on true stories of the partly tragic saga of six men who separated from their wives. She played the girlfriend of one of the main cast members.

In October 2014, Rivera starred in Rock of Ages, a jukebox musical that tells the story of the two young dreamers, Drew and Sherrie. Portraying the role of "Sherrie Christian" who dreamt of a career in Hollywood but worked as a stripper while in the pursuit of her dreams, this enabled Rivera to stretch out of the more conservative roles she had previously played, and into a more sexy role

In August 2018, Atlantis Theatrical Entertainment Group cast Rivera to play the lead role of "Violet Hilton" together with Gab Pangilinan (Daisy Hilton) in "Side Show" (true story of the famous conjoined twins). Rivera was nominated again as "Best Actress in Musical" at Broadway World Philippines.

On April 25, 2019, Rivera concluded her four-year degree course Bachelor of Arts in Communications, minor in Economics at the University of Calgary (Canada).

In June 2019, included in the special line-up of shows in celebration of Atlantis Theatrical Group’s 20th Anniversary, was “Beautiful: The Carole King Musical” where Rivera starred as the title role.

In February 2020, Rivera joined Sam Concepcion (as Joseph) in the much-awaited return of Trumpet's most beloved production, “Joseph the Dreamer”. She played a dual role as the Narrator and Asenath (Joseph's wife).

Notable stage credits

Filmography and television appearances

References 

1990 births
Living people
Musicians from Calgary
Canadian musicians of Filipino descent
Canadian people of Romanian descent
21st-century Canadian women singers
Canadian actresses of Filipino descent